Leslie George Godfrey (born 1946) is a British econometrician. The Breusch–Godfrey test is named after him and Trevor S. Breusch. He is an Emeritus Professor of Econometrics at the University of York. He is the author of  "Misspecification tests in econometrics: the Lagrange multiplier principle and other approaches" and "Bootstrap Tests for Regression Models".

References

External links
 Professor profile on University of York

British economists
Econometricians
Living people
1946 births